North Cumbria Integrated Care NHS Foundation Trust was created in October 2019 by a merger between Cumbria Partnership NHS Foundation Trust and North Cumbria University Hospitals NHS Trust. It provides mental health and community services in Cumbria

It runs Cumberland Infirmary in Carlisle, Cumbria, the birthing unit at Penrith Hospital and West Cumberland Hospital in Whitehaven.

In November 2020 the Care Quality Commission  said the trust had an “inexperienced leadership team” which “did not always have the necessary skills and abilities to lead effectively”, after issuing a warning notice to improve care in its two emergency departments.

References

External links 
 
 North Cumbria Integrated Care NHS Foundation Trust on the NHS website
 Inspection reports from the Care Quality Commission

Health in Cumbria
NHS foundation trusts